J. Frank Deem (March 20, 1928 – October 10, 2018) was an American businessman and politician.

Deem was born in Harrisville, West Virginia. He served in the United States Navy. Deem received his bachelor's degree in petroleum engineering from Marietta College. He was involved in the oil and gas drilling business and was the owner of the J. F. Deem Oil and Gas Limited Liability Company. Deem lived in Vienna, West Virginia. Deem served in the West Virginia Senate from 1964 to 1978 and from 1994 to 2010. He also served in the West Virginia House of Delegates from 1954 to 1962, from 1988 to 1990, and from 2014 to his death in 2018. He was a Republican.

Deem died from pneumonia at Camden Clark Medical Center in Parkersburg, West Virginia.

Notes

1928 births
2018 deaths
People from Harrisville, West Virginia
People from Vienna, West Virginia
Military personnel from West Virginia
Marietta College alumni
Businesspeople from West Virginia
Engineers from West Virginia
Republican Party West Virginia state senators
Republican Party members of the West Virginia House of Delegates
Deaths from pneumonia in West Virginia
20th-century American businesspeople